Cozzolino is an Italian surname. Notable people with the surname include:

 Andrea Cozzolino (born 1962), Italian politician 
 Dominic Cozzolino (born 1994), Canadian ice sledge hockey player
 Giuseppe Cozzolino (born 1985), Italian footballer
 Kei Cozzolino (born 1987), Japanese-born Italian racing driver
 Pasquale Cozzolino, a Neapolitan chef based in New York

Italian-language surnames